The 1952–53 Egyptian Premier League started in November 1952. Al Ahly were crowned champions for the fourth time in the club's history.

League table 

 (C)= Champions, (R)= Relegated, Pld = Matches played; W = Matches won; D = Matches drawn; L = Matches lost; F = Goals for; A = Goals against; ± = Goal difference; Pts = Points.

References

External links 
 All Egyptian Competitions Info
 season info

5
1952–53 in African association football leagues
1952–53 in Egyptian football